Filip Uremović (born 11 February 1997) is a Croatian professional footballer who plays as a centre-back for Bundesliga club Hertha BSC and the Croatia national team.

Club career
Uremović made his Croatian First Football League debut for Cibalia on 17 July 2016 in a game against Hajduk Split.

On 4 June 2018, Uremović signed a four-year contract with the Russian Premier League side Rubin Kazan. On 13 March 2022, Uremović's contract with Rubin was suspended until 30 June 2022, according to the new FIFA regulations related to the Russian invasion of Ukraine. Those regulations allow foreign players in Russia to suspend their contract and sign with a club outside of Russia temporarily until 30 June 2022.

On 24 March 2022, Uremović signed with Sheffield United until the end of the season.

Rubin Kazan was relegated from the Russian Premier League at the end of the 2021–22 season, and Uremović activated a clause in his contract that allowed him to become a free agent in case of relegation. He then signed a four-year contract with German club Hertha BSC.

International career
Uremović made his Croatia national team debut on 8 September 2020 in a UEFA Nations League game against France. He started the game and played the first 57 minutes of a 4–2 away loss. On 17 May 2021, Uremović was named in the preliminary 34-man squad for the UEFA Euro 2020, but did not make the final 26.

Career statistics

Honours 
Olimpija Ljubljana
Slovenian PrvaLiga: 2017–18
Slovenian Football Cup: 2017–18

References

External links

 Profile at the Hertha BSC website
 

1997 births
Living people
People from Požega, Croatia
Association football central defenders
Croatian footballers
Croatia youth international footballers
Croatia under-21 international footballers
Croatia international footballers
HNK Cibalia players
GNK Dinamo Zagreb players
GNK Dinamo Zagreb II players
NK Olimpija Ljubljana (2005) players
FC Rubin Kazan players
Sheffield United F.C. players
Hertha BSC players
Croatian Football League players
First Football League (Croatia) players
Slovenian PrvaLiga players
Russian Premier League players
English Football League players
Bundesliga players
Croatian expatriate footballers
Expatriate footballers in Slovenia
Expatriate footballers in Russia
Expatriate footballers in England
Expatriate footballers in Germany
Croatian expatriate sportspeople in Slovenia
Croatian expatriate sportspeople in Russia
Croatian expatriate sportspeople in England
Croatian expatriate sportspeople in Germany